Zirconium silicate, also zirconium orthosilicate, ZrSiO4, is a chemical compound, a silicate of zirconium. It occurs in nature as zircon, a silicate mineral. Powdered zirconium silicate is also known as zircon flour.

Zirconium silicate is usually colorless, but impurities induce various colorations. It is insoluble in water, acids, alkali and aqua regia. Hardness is 7.5 on the Mohs scale.

Structure and bonding
Zircon consists of 8-coordinated Zr4+ centers linked to tetrahedral orthosilicate SiO44- sites.  The oxygen atoms are all triply bridging, each with the environment OZr2Si.  Given its highly crosslinked structure, the material is hard, and hence prized as gemstone and abrasive.

Zr(IV) is a d0 ion.  Consequently the material is colorless and diamagnetic.

Production
Zirconium silicate occurs in nature as mineral zircon. Concentrated sources of zircon are rare.  It is mined from sand deposits and separated by gravity.  Some sands contain a few percent of zircon.

It can also be synthesized by fusion of SiO2 and ZrO2 in an arc furnace, or by reacting a zirconium salt with sodium silicate in an aqueous solution.

Uses
As of 1995, the annual consumption of zirconium silicate  was nearly 1M tons.  The major applications exploit its refractory nature and resistance to corrosion by alkali materials. Two end-uses are for enamels, and ceramic glazes. In enamels and glazes it serves as an opacifier. It can be also present in some cements.

Another use of zirconium silicate is as beads for milling and grinding.

Thin films of zirconium silicate and hafnium silicate produced by chemical vapor deposition, most often MOCVD, can be used as a high-k dielectric as a replacement for silicon dioxide in semiconductors.

Zirconium silicates have also been studied for potential use in medical applications. For example, ZS-9 is a zirconium silicate that was designed specifically to trap potassium ions over other ions throughout the gastrointestinal tract.

Toxicity
Zirconium silicate is an abrasive irritant for skin and eyes. Chronic exposure to dust can cause pulmonary granulomas, skin inflammation, and skin granuloma. However, there are no known adverse effects for normal, incidental ingestion.

References

Silicates
Zirconium compounds
Refractory materials
High-κ dielectrics